The 1987–88 English Hockey League season took place from September 1987 until May 1988.

The season culminated in the National Inter League Championship for men which brought together the winners of their respective regions. The championship was won by Southgate.

The Men's Hockey Association Cup was won by Southgate and the Women's Cup (National Club Championship finals) was won by Ealing.

Men's National Inter League Championship finals 
(Held at Prescot, April 30 - May 1)

Group A

Group B

Semi-finals & Final 

Southgate
David Owen, Peter Boxell, Richard Dodds, Mark Donnelly, Soma Singh, Andrew Western, Paul Moulton, John Shaw, David Thomas, Steve Batchelor, Sean Kerly (capt)
Stourport
S Taylor, J Lee (capt), P Lee, M Reason, A Watson, D Shepherd, Mark Harradine, John McPhun, Imran Sherwani, Malcolm Evans, David Knott

Men's Cup (Hockey Association Cup)

Quarter-finals

Semi-finals

Final 
(Held at Canterbury on 14 March)

Southgate
David Owen, Richard Dodds, Mike Spray, James Duthie, Robert Clift, John Shaw, Soma Singh, Steve Batchelor, Paul Moulton (Rupert Welch sub), David Thomas, Sean Kerly
Hounslow
Veryan Pappin, I Meakins, Dave Dixon, Guy Swayne, Jon Potter, David Hacker, Nick Gordon, Jon Rees, Robert Thompson, Tony Diamond, Martyn Grimley

Women's Cup (National Club Championship finals) 
(Held at Coventry School, Coundon, April 23–24)

Final

Final Placings

References 

1987
field hockey
field hockey
1987 in field hockey
1988 in field hockey